Lakewood is a ghost town in Lyon County, in the U.S. state of Iowa.

History
A post office was established at Lakewood in 1900, and remained in operation until it was discontinued in 1918. The town was named from a nearby lake in the woods.

Lakewood's population was 25 in 1925.

See also
 List of ghost towns in the United States

References

Geography of Lyon County, Iowa
Ghost towns in Iowa